The 1936 Pittsburgh Pirates season was the 55th season of the Pittsburgh Pirates franchise; the 50th in the National League. The Pirates finished fourth in the league standings with a record of 84–70.

Offseason 
 November 21, 1935: Claude Passeau and Earl Grace were traded by the Pirates to the Philadelphia Phillies for Al Todd.
 December 12, 1935: Tommy Thevenow was purchased from the Pirates by the Cincinnati Reds.

Regular season 
 July 10, 1936: Chuck Klein of the Philadelphia Phillies hit four home runs in a ten inning game against the Pirates at Forbes Field.

Season standings

Record vs. opponents

Game log

|- bgcolor="ccffcc"
| 1 || April 14 || @ Reds || 8–6 || Hoyt (1–0) || Derringer || — || 32,243 || 1–0
|- bgcolor="ccffcc"
| 2 || April 15 || @ Reds || 7–6 || Birkofer (1–0) || Freitas || — || 2,868 || 2–0
|- bgcolor="ffbbbb"
| 3 || April 16 || @ Reds || 4–7 || Hollingsworth || Weaver (0–1) || — || 1,836 || 2–1
|- bgcolor="ffbbbb"
| 4 || April 19 || Cardinals || 3–7 || Hallahan || Lucas (0–1) || — || 17,500 || 2–2
|- bgcolor="ccffcc"
| 5 || April 20 || Cubs || 9–8 || Swift (1–0) || Henshaw || — || — || 3–2
|- bgcolor="ffbbbb"
| 6 || April 23 || @ Cubs || 1–2 || French || Birkofer (1–1) || — || — || 3–3
|- bgcolor="ffbbbb"
| 7 || April 24 || @ Cubs || 1–6 || Warneke || Blanton (0–1) || — || — || 3–4
|- bgcolor="ccffcc"
| 8 || April 25 || @ Cardinals || 12–5 || Weaver (1–1) || Hallahan || — || — || 4–4
|- bgcolor="ffbbbb"
| 9 || April 26 || @ Cardinals || 2–3 (10) || Dean || Swift (1–1) || — || 5,500 || 4–5
|- bgcolor="ffbbbb"
| 10 || April 28 || Phillies || 7–9 || Johnson || Brown (0–1) || — || — || 4–6
|- bgcolor="ccffcc"
| 11 || April 29 || Phillies || 10–9 (11) || Lucas (1–1) || Walters || — || — || 5–6
|- bgcolor="ccffcc"
| 12 || April 30 || Phillies || 6–5 || Weaver (2–1) || Jorgens || Brown (1) || — || 6–6
|-

|- bgcolor="ffbbbb"
| 13 || May 1 || Bees || 4–6 || Osborne || Swift (1–2) || Smith || 2,000 || 6–7
|- bgcolor="ccffcc"
| 14 || May 2 || Bees || 6–1 || Tising (1–0) || Chaplin || — || 5,000 || 7–7
|- bgcolor="ccffcc"
| 15 || May 3 || Dodgers || 6–5 || Hoyt (2–0) || Mungo || — || 10,000 || 8–7
|- bgcolor="ccffcc"
| 16 || May 5 || Dodgers || 4–0 || Weaver (3–1) || Clark || — || 1,600 || 9–7
|- bgcolor="ffbbbb"
| 17 || May 6 || Giants || 5–6 (10) || Gabler || Hoyt (2–1) || — || — || 9–8
|- bgcolor="ccffcc"
| 18 || May 7 || Giants || 6–2 || Birkofer (2–1) || Castleman || — || 10,000 || 10–8
|- bgcolor="ccffcc"
| 19 || May 8 || Reds || 9–6 || Swift (2–2) || Stine || Blanton (1) || — || 11–8
|- bgcolor="ccffcc"
| 20 || May 9 || Reds || 10–6 || Blanton (1–1) || Brennan || — || — || 12–8
|- bgcolor="ffbbbb"
| 21 || May 10 || Reds || 0–6 || Derringer || Tising (1–1) || — || 13,955 || 12–9
|- bgcolor="ffffff"
| 22 || May 12 || @ Bees || 6–6 (10) ||  ||  || — || 2,000 || 12–9
|- bgcolor="ffbbbb"
| 23 || May 13 || @ Bees || 3–4 (10) || MacFayden || Hoyt (2–2) || — || 2,500 || 12–10
|- bgcolor="ccffcc"
| 24 || May 14 || @ Bees || 5–2 || Bush (1–0) || Benge || — || 1,600 || 13–10
|- bgcolor="ccffcc"
| 25 || May 15 || @ Dodgers || 6–2 || Weaver (4–1) || Mungo || — || 4,000 || 14–10
|- bgcolor="ffbbbb"
| 26 || May 16 || @ Dodgers || 0–3 || Clark || Blanton (1–2) || — || 8,000 || 14–11
|- bgcolor="ffbbbb"
| 27 || May 17 || @ Giants || 6–8 || Castleman || Bush (1–1) || Gabler || 29,000 || 14–12
|- bgcolor="ffbbbb"
| 28 || May 18 || @ Giants || 2–4 || Hubbell || Tising (1–2) || — || — || 14–13
|- bgcolor="ccffcc"
| 29 || May 20 || @ Phillies || 9–3 || Weaver (5–1) || Zachary || — || — || 15–13
|- bgcolor="ccffcc"
| 30 || May 21 || @ Phillies || 7–4 || Birkofer (3–1) || Jorgens || — || — || 16–13
|- bgcolor="ffbbbb"
| 31 || May 22 || Cardinals || 4–11 || Dean || Tising (1–3) || — || — || 16–14
|- bgcolor="ffbbbb"
| 32 || May 23 || @ Reds || 3–4 || Brennan || Blanton (1–3) || — || — || 16–15
|- bgcolor="ffbbbb"
| 33 || May 24 || @ Reds || 1–12 || Hollingsworth || Weaver (5–2) || — || 11,526 || 16–16
|- bgcolor="ccffcc"
| 34 || May 25 || @ Reds || 9–2 || Lucas (2–1) || Schott || — || 1,869 || 17–16
|- bgcolor="ffbbbb"
| 35 || May 26 || @ Cardinals || 2–6 || Dean || Blanton (1–4) || — || — || 17–17
|- bgcolor="ffbbbb"
| 36 || May 26 || @ Cardinals || 2–6 || Winford || Birkofer (3–2) || — || — || 17–18
|- bgcolor="ccffcc"
| 37 || May 27 || @ Cardinals || 11–2 || Swift (3–2) || Hallahan || — || — || 18–18
|- bgcolor="ccffcc"
| 38 || May 28 || @ Cardinals || 7–2 || Weaver (6–2) || Walker || — || — || 19–18
|- bgcolor="ffbbbb"
| 39 || May 29 || @ Cardinals || 7–9 || Dean || Bush (1–2) || — || — || 19–19
|- bgcolor="ccffcc"
| 40 || May 30 || @ Cubs || 7–5 || Swift (4–2) || Root || — || — || 20–19
|- bgcolor="ccffcc"
| 41 || May 30 || @ Cubs || 11–7 || Brown (1–1) || Bryant || Bush (1) || 43,332 || 21–19
|- bgcolor="ffbbbb"
| 42 || May 31 || @ Cubs || 7–8 (10) || Carleton || Bush (1–3) || — || — || 21–20
|-

|- bgcolor="ccffcc"
| 43 || June 2 || Bees || 5–4 || Weaver (7–2) || Chaplin || Brown (2) || 2,500 || 22–20
|- bgcolor="ffbbbb"
| 44 || June 3 || Bees || 3–4 (11) || Reis || Swift (4–3) || — || 2,000 || 22–21
|- bgcolor="ccffcc"
| 45 || June 4 || Bees || 7–5 || Blanton (2–4) || Lanning || Brown (3) || — || 23–21
|- bgcolor="ccffcc"
| 46 || June 5 || Phillies || 14–8 || Brown (2–1) || Bowman || — || — || 24–21
|- bgcolor="ffbbbb"
| 47 || June 6 || Phillies || 1–5 || Jorgens || Weaver (7–3) || — || — || 24–22
|- bgcolor="ccffcc"
| 48 || June 7 || Phillies || 6–2 || Swift (5–3) || Moore || — || — || 25–22
|- bgcolor="ccffcc"
| 49 || June 8 || Dodgers || 2–1 || Blanton (3–4) || Brandt || — || — || 26–22
|- bgcolor="ccffcc"
| 50 || June 9 || Dodgers || 4–1 || Weaver (8–3) || Earnshaw || — || — || 27–22
|- bgcolor="ccffcc"
| 51 || June 9 || Dodgers || 7–5 || Brown (3–1) || Mungo || — || 8,000 || 28–22
|- bgcolor="ccffcc"
| 52 || June 10 || Dodgers || 6–3 || Lucas (3–1) || Clark || Bush (2) || — || 29–22
|- bgcolor="ccffcc"
| 53 || June 12 || Giants || 3–2 || Swift (6–3) || Hubbell || — || — || 30–22
|- bgcolor="ccffcc"
| 54 || June 13 || Giants || 6–2 || Blanton (4–4) || Smith || — || — || 31–22
|- bgcolor="ffbbbb"
| 55 || June 14 || Giants || 0–8 || Schumacher || Weaver (8–4) || — || 32,000 || 31–23
|- bgcolor="ccffcc"
| 56 || June 16 || @ Dodgers || 9–2 || Lucas (4–1) || Mungo || — || 3,500 || 32–23
|- bgcolor="ccffcc"
| 57 || June 17 || @ Dodgers || 14–5 || Swift (7–3) || Baker || — || — || 33–23
|- bgcolor="ccffcc"
| 58 || June 20 || @ Phillies || 6–0 || Blanton (5–4) || Bowman || — || — || 34–23
|- bgcolor="ffbbbb"
| 59 || June 20 || @ Phillies || 1–2 || Jorgens || Weaver (8–5) || Johnson || — || 34–24
|- bgcolor="ccffcc"
| 60 || June 21 || @ Phillies || 7–6 || Lucas (5–1) || Kowalik || — || 5,000 || 35–24
|- bgcolor="ffbbbb"
| 61 || June 22 || @ Giants || 5–11 || Schumacher || Swift (7–4) || — || 5,314 || 35–25
|- bgcolor="ffbbbb"
| 62 || June 23 || @ Giants || 2–3 || Gumbert || Brown (3–2) || Smith || 5,500 || 35–26
|- bgcolor="ffbbbb"
| 63 || June 24 || @ Giants || 3–4 || Hubbell || Birkofer (3–3) || — || — || 35–27
|- bgcolor="ccffcc"
| 64 || June 24 || @ Giants || 4–1 || Weaver (9–5) || Fitzsimmons || — || 15,000 || 36–27
|- bgcolor="ffbbbb"
| 65 || June 25 || @ Giants || 4–5 || Coffman || Swift (7–5) || — || 5,000 || 36–28
|- bgcolor="ccffcc"
| 66 || June 26 || @ Bees || 2–1 || Lucas (6–1) || MacFayden || — || 5,352 || 37–28
|- bgcolor="ccffcc"
| 67 || June 28 || @ Bees || 11–2 || Blanton (6–4) || Benge || — || — || 38–28
|- bgcolor="ffbbbb"
| 68 || June 28 || @ Bees || 4–6 || Cantwell || Weaver (9–6) || Smith || 18,133 || 38–29
|- bgcolor="ffbbbb"
| 69 || June 30 || Cardinals || 1–2 || Haines || Brown (3–3) || — || — || 38–30
|- bgcolor="ffbbbb"
| 70 || June 30 || Cardinals || 3–4 || Rhem || Blanton (6–5) || Dean || 20,000 || 38–31
|-

|- bgcolor="ccffcc"
| 71 || July 1 || Cardinals || 9–4 || Lucas (7–1) || Walker || Swift (1) || — || 39–31
|- bgcolor="ffbbbb"
| 72 || July 2 || Cardinals || 2–4 || Dean || Weaver (9–7) || — || — || 39–32
|- bgcolor="ffbbbb"
| 73 || July 4 || Cubs || 2–3 (10) || French || Blanton (6–6) || — || — || 39–33
|- bgcolor="ccffcc"
| 74 || July 4 || Cubs || 7–4 || Brown (4–3) || Lee || Welch (1) || 33,000 || 40–33
|- bgcolor="ccffcc"
| 75 || July 5 || Cubs || 4–2 || Swift (8–5) || Warneke || — || — || 41–33
|- bgcolor="ccffcc"
| 76 || July 9 || Phillies || 16–5 || Birkofer (4–3) || Kowalik || — || — || 42–33
|- bgcolor="ffbbbb"
| 77 || July 10 || Phillies || 6–9 (10) || Walters || Swift (8–6) || — || — || 42–34
|- bgcolor="ffbbbb"
| 78 || July 12 || Bees || 2–6 (10) || Cantwell || Blanton (6–7) || — || 5,000 || 42–35
|- bgcolor="ffbbbb"
| 79 || July 13 || Bees || 1–4 || Chaplin || Swift (8–7) || — || 1,200 || 42–36
|- bgcolor="ccffcc"
| 80 || July 14 || Bees || 2–1 || Brown (5–3) || MacFayden || — || 2,000 || 43–36
|- bgcolor="ccffcc"
| 81 || July 15 || Giants || 5–4 (10) || Birkofer (5–3) || Fitzsimmons || — || — || 44–36
|- bgcolor="ffbbbb"
| 82 || July 15 || Giants || 4–14 || Smith || Weaver (9–8) || — || 15,000 || 44–37
|- bgcolor="ffbbbb"
| 83 || July 16 || Giants || 6–7 || Coffman || Brown (5–4) || Schumacher || 6,000 || 44–38
|- bgcolor="ffbbbb"
| 84 || July 17 || Giants || 0–6 || Hubbell || Swift (8–8) || — || — || 44–39
|- bgcolor="ffbbbb"
| 85 || July 18 || Dodgers || 5–6 || Jeffcoat || Brown (5–5) || Clark || 8,000 || 44–40
|- bgcolor="ffbbbb"
| 86 || July 19 || Dodgers || 2–4 || Clark || Blanton (6–8) || Mungo || 4,000 || 44–41
|- bgcolor="ccffcc"
| 87 || July 21 || @ Phillies || 17–6 || Swift (9–8) || Moore || — || — || 45–41
|- bgcolor="ffbbbb"
| 88 || July 22 || @ Phillies || 4–16 || Bowman || Brown (5–6) || — || — || 45–42
|- bgcolor="ccffcc"
| 89 || July 23 || @ Phillies || 10–1 || Blanton (7–8) || Passeau || — || — || 46–42
|- bgcolor="ccffcc"
| 90 || July 25 || @ Dodgers || 7–4 || Swift (10–8) || Clark || — || 4,700 || 47–42
|- bgcolor="ffbbbb"
| 91 || July 26 || @ Dodgers || 0–1 || Mungo || Lucas (7–2) || — || — || 47–43
|- bgcolor="ffbbbb"
| 92 || July 26 || @ Dodgers || 3–4 || Brandt || Brown (5–7) || — || 15,000 || 47–44
|- bgcolor="ffbbbb"
| 93 || July 27 || @ Dodgers || 3–6 || Frankhouse || Blanton (7–9) || — || 485 || 47–45
|- bgcolor="ccffcc"
| 94 || July 28 || @ Dodgers || 9–8 (10) || Lucas (8–2) || Brandt || — || — || 48–45
|- bgcolor="ffbbbb"
| 95 || July 29 || @ Bees || 1–4 || MacFayden || Swift (10–9) || — || 9,284 || 48–46
|- bgcolor="ccffcc"
| 96 || July 29 || @ Bees || 10–4 || Brown (6–7) || Smith || — || 9,284 || 49–46
|- bgcolor="ccffcc"
| 97 || July 30 || @ Bees || 5–3 (11) || Brown (7–7) || Cantwell || — || 2,612 || 50–46
|- bgcolor="ccffcc"
| 98 || July 31 || @ Bees || 10–5 || Weaver (10–8) || Chaplin || Hoyt (1) || 3,216 || 51–46
|-

|- bgcolor="ffbbbb"
| 99 || August 1 || @ Giants || 0–6 || Smith || Blanton (7–10) || — || — || 51–47
|- bgcolor="ffbbbb"
| 100 || August 2 || @ Giants || 2–3 || Hubbell || Swift (10–10) || — || 15,000 || 51–48
|- bgcolor="ffbbbb"
| 101 || August 5 || @ Reds || 4–6 || Schott || Brown (7–8) || — || 6,373 || 51–49
|- bgcolor="ccffcc"
| 102 || August 7 || @ Reds || 5–1 || Lucas (9–2) || Hollingsworth || — || — || 52–49
|- bgcolor="ccffcc"
| 103 || August 7 || @ Reds || 1–0 || Blanton (8–10) || Hallahan || — || 3,969 || 53–49
|- bgcolor="ffbbbb"
| 104 || August 8 || @ Cubs || 2–3 || French || Swift (10–11) || — || — || 53–50
|- bgcolor="ffbbbb"
| 105 || August 9 || @ Cubs || 2–9 || Lee || Brown (7–9) || — || — || 53–51
|- bgcolor="ffbbbb"
| 106 || August 9 || @ Cubs || 1–10 || Davis || Birkofer (5–4) || — || 40,000 || 53–52
|- bgcolor="ccffcc"
| 107 || August 11 || Reds || 6–3 || Lucas (10–2) || Derringer || — || — || 54–52
|- bgcolor="ffbbbb"
| 108 || August 11 || Reds || 3–7 || Hallahan || Blanton (8–11) || — || — || 54–53
|- bgcolor="ccffcc"
| 109 || August 12 || Reds || 6–1 || Swift (11–11) || Schott || — || — || 55–53
|- bgcolor="ccffcc"
| 110 || August 13 || Reds || 5–4 || Hoyt (3–2) || Hollingsworth || — || — || 56–53
|- bgcolor="ccffcc"
| 111 || August 15 || Cardinals || 7–1 || Weaver (11–8) || Haines || — || — || 57–53
|- bgcolor="ffbbbb"
| 112 || August 16 || Cardinals || 3–4 || Winford || Lucas (10–3) || Parmelee || — || 57–54
|- bgcolor="ffbbbb"
| 113 || August 16 || Cardinals || 2–7 || Dean || Swift (11–12) || — || 35,000 || 57–55
|- bgcolor="ffbbbb"
| 114 || August 18 || Cubs || 4–5 || French || Blanton (8–12) || — || — || 57–56
|- bgcolor="ccffcc"
| 115 || August 18 || Cubs || 3–1 || Hoyt (4–2) || Lee || — || — || 58–56
|- bgcolor="ccffcc"
| 116 || August 19 || Cubs || 5–4 || Swift (12–12) || Root || — || — || 59–56
|- bgcolor="ccffcc"
| 117 || August 20 || Cubs || 8–7 (11) || Birkofer (6–4) || Warneke || — || — || 60–56
|- bgcolor="ccffcc"
| 118 || August 21 || @ Cardinals || 5–4 || Lucas (11–3) || Haines || — || — || 61–56
|- bgcolor="ffbbbb"
| 119 || August 22 || @ Cardinals || 3–4 || Winford || Swift (12–13) || — || — || 61–57
|- bgcolor="ffbbbb"
| 120 || August 23 || @ Cardinals || 3–7 || Heusser || Blanton (8–13) || — || — || 61–58
|- bgcolor="ffffff"
| 121 || August 23 || @ Cardinals || 6–6 (10) ||  ||  || — || — || 61–58
|- bgcolor="ccffcc"
| 122 || August 24 || @ Cardinals || 17–5 || Brown (8–9) || Heusser || — || — || 62–58
|- bgcolor="ffbbbb"
| 123 || August 25 || Dodgers || 1–4 (8) || Butcher || Birkofer (6–5) || — || — || 62–59
|- bgcolor="ffbbbb"
| 124 || August 26 || Dodgers || 3–10 || Brandt || Swift (12–14) || — || — || 62–60
|- bgcolor="ccffcc"
| 125 || August 27 || Dodgers || 6–3 || Weaver (12–8) || Mungo || Blanton (2) || 2,500 || 63–60
|- bgcolor="ffbbbb"
| 126 || August 28 || Giants || 2–7 (14) || Fitzsimmons || Hoyt (4–3) || Gabler || 5,000 || 63–61
|- bgcolor="ccffcc"
| 127 || August 29 || Giants || 7–4 || Lucas (12–3) || Smith || — || — || 64–61
|- bgcolor="ccffcc"
| 128 || August 30 || Bees || 4–2 || Swift (13–14) || Chaplin || — || — || 65–61
|- bgcolor="ccffcc"
| 129 || August 30 || Bees || 3–1 || Blanton (9–13) || Smith || — || 8,000 || 66–61
|-

|- bgcolor="ccffcc"
| 130 || September 1 || Bees || 3–1 || Weaver (13–8) || MacFayden || — || 1,000 || 67–61
|- bgcolor="ffbbbb"
| 131 || September 3 || Phillies || 3–4 || Bowman || Lucas (12–4) || — || — || 67–62
|- bgcolor="ccffcc"
| 132 || September 3 || Phillies || 5–1 || Hoyt (5–3) || Passeau || — || 5,000 || 68–62
|- bgcolor="ffbbbb"
| 133 || September 4 || Cubs || 0–8 || French || Swift (13–15) || — || — || 68–63
|- bgcolor="ccffcc"
| 134 || September 5 || Cubs || 1–0 || Blanton (10–13) || Henshaw || — || — || 69–63
|- bgcolor="ccffcc"
| 135 || September 6 || Cubs || 5–4 || Weaver (14–8) || Davis || Swift (2) || — || 70–63
|- bgcolor="ccffcc"
| 136 || September 7 || Cardinals || 4–1 || Hoyt (6–3) || Dean || — || — || 71–63
|- bgcolor="ccffcc"
| 137 || September 7 || Cardinals || 14–1 || Brown (9–9) || Parmelee || — || — || 72–63
|- bgcolor="ffbbbb"
| 138 || September 9 || @ Dodgers || 7–8 || Brandt || Blanton (10–14) || — || — || 72–64
|- bgcolor="ccffcc"
| 139 || September 10 || @ Dodgers || 11–5 || Swift (14–15) || Frankhouse || — || 5,000 || 73–64
|- bgcolor="ccffcc"
| 140 || September 11 || @ Bees || 10–3 || Blanton (11–14) || Weir || — || 1,594 || 74–64
|- bgcolor="ffbbbb"
| 141 || September 12 || @ Bees || 2–3 || Bush || Hoyt (6–4) || — || 1,500 || 74–65
|- bgcolor="ccffcc"
| 142 || September 13 || @ Phillies || 5–3 || Birkofer (7–5) || Sivess || Blanton (3) || — || 75–65
|- bgcolor="ffbbbb"
| 143 || September 13 || @ Phillies || 3–4 || Jorgens || Brown (9–10) || — || — || 75–66
|- bgcolor="ccffcc"
| 144 || September 14 || @ Phillies || 11–4 || Swift (15–15) || Benge || — || — || 76–66
|- bgcolor="ccffcc"
| 145 || September 14 || @ Phillies || 6–5 (10) || Lucas (13–4) || Bowman || — || — || 77–66
|- bgcolor="ffbbbb"
| 146 || September 16 || @ Giants || 1–2 || Smith || Blanton (11–15) || Coffman || — || 77–67
|- bgcolor="ccffcc"
| 147 || September 16 || @ Giants || 4–3 || Hoyt (7–4) || Schumacher || — || 22,000 || 78–67
|- bgcolor="ccffcc"
| 148 || September 17 || Reds || 14–10 || Brown (10–10) || Hollingsworth || — || — || 79–67
|- bgcolor="ccffcc"
| 149 || September 19 || Reds || 7–6 (11) || Swift (16–15) || Hallahan || — || — || 80–67
|- bgcolor="ccffcc"
| 150 || September 20 || Reds || 5–1 || Blanton (12–15) || Derringer || — || — || 81–67
|- bgcolor="ccffcc"
| 151 || September 20 || Reds || 6–4 || Lucas (14–4) || Davis || — || 10,000 || 82–67
|- bgcolor="ffbbbb"
| 152 || September 22 || @ Cubs || 4–11 || Davis || Hoyt (7–5) || — || 3,900 || 82–68
|- bgcolor="ccffcc"
| 153 || September 23 || @ Cubs || 7–6 (10) || Lucas (15–4) || Warneke || — || — || 83–68
|- bgcolor="ccffcc"
| 154 || September 24 || @ Cubs || 4–0 || Blanton (13–15) || French || — || 13,000 || 84–68
|- bgcolor="ffbbbb"
| 155 || September 26 || @ Reds || 1–5 || Hallahan || Swift (16–16) || — || — || 84–69
|- bgcolor="ffbbbb"
| 156 || September 27 || @ Reds || 5–6 || Moore || Brown (10–11) || Mooty || 5,377 || 84–70
|-

|-
| Legend:       = Win       = Loss       = TieBold = Pirates team member

Opening Day lineup

Roster

Player stats

Batting

Starters by position 
Note: Pos = Position; G = Games played; AB = At bats; H = Hits; Avg. = Batting average; HR = Home runs; RBI = Runs batted in

Other batters 
Note: G = Games played; AB = At bats; H = Hits; Avg. = Batting average; HR = Home runs; RBI = Runs batted in

Pitching

Starting pitchers 
Note: G = Games pitched; IP = Innings pitched; W = Wins; L = Losses; ERA = Earned run average; SO = Strikeouts

Other pitchers 
Note: G = Games pitched; IP = Innings pitched; W = Wins; L = Losses; ERA = Earned run average; SO = Strikeouts

Relief pitchers 
Note: G = Games pitched; W = Wins; L = Losses; SV = Saves; ERA = Earned run average; SO = Strikeouts

Awards and honors 
1936 Major League Baseball All-Star Game
Gus Suhr, reserve
Arky Vaughan, reserve

League top five finishers 
Cy Blanton
 #3 in NL in strikeouts (127)

Red Lucas
 #5 in NL in ERA (3.18)

Gus Suhr
 #3 in NL in RBI (118)
 #5 in NL in runs scored (111)

Bill Swift
 #5 in NL in losses (16)

Arky Vaughan
 NL leader in runs scored (122)
 NL leader in on-base percentage (.453)
 #5 in NL in batting average (.335)

Paul Waner
 NL leader in batting average (.373)
 #2 in NL in hits (218)
 #3 in NL in on-base percentage (.446)
 #5 in NL in slugging percentage (.520)

Farm system

LEAGUE CHAMPIONS: Scranton, Jeannette

Notes

References 
 1936 Pittsburgh Pirates team page at Baseball Reference
 1936 Pittsburgh Pirates Page at Baseball Almanac

Pittsburgh Pirates seasons
Pittsburgh Pirates season
Pittsburg Pir